Saltley railway station was a railway station in Saltley, Birmingham, England, opened by the Midland Railway in 1854 and rebuilt in 1899.

Consisting of an island platform, it was on the line into Birmingham New Street from Water Orton. It closed to all traffic in 1968.

Motive Power Depot

Saltley station was the site of a large roundhouse motive power depot established by the Midland Railway in 1868. This was doubled in size in 1876, by the addition of a second roundhouse, and a third was added in 1900. The depot was re-roofed by British Railways in 1951, but closed on 6 March 1967 and was later demolished. The shed yard was used for stabling diesel locomotives until at least 1999. Under the London Midland and Scottish Railway and British Railways Saltley had the shed code 21A. As a diesel stabling depot it was SY.

References

Former Midland Railway stations
Railway stations in Great Britain opened in 1854
Railway stations in Great Britain closed in 1968
Disused railway stations in Birmingham, West Midlands